Maja Keuc (born 16 January 1992), also known as Amaya, is a Slovenian singer. She represented Slovenia in the Eurovision Song Contest 2011.

Career 
Keuc was born on 16 January 1992 in Maribor, Slovenia. During her childhood, she joined the "English student theatre" where she got a lot of stage experience including singing, dancing and playing instruments. In 2010, Maja competed in the talent show Slovenija ima talent (Slovenia's Got Talent) and finished as a runner-up to a 7-year-old girl Lina Kuduzović.

She represented Slovenia at the Eurovision Song Contest 2011 with the song "No One" eventually finishing 13th in the grand final. She finished 3rd in the second semi-final with 113 points. According to jury votes only in semi-final she would finish 1st and according to votes only from jury in final she would finish 4th.

She released her second studio album Fairytales in September 2016, under the name Amaya.

Personal life
Keuc was engaged to Swedish band Dirty Loops vocalist Jonah Nilsson, but they got separated. She lives in Stockholm, Sweden.

Discography

Studio albums 
Indigo (2011)
Fairytales (2016)

Singles 
No One (2011)
Zmorem (2011)
You're a Tree and I'm a Balloon (2011)
Get The Party Started (2011)
Go with the Flow (2011)
Ta planet (2011)
Na pol poti (2011)
Krog (2011)
Ta čas (2012)
Tako lepo mi je (2012)
Close to You (2014)
Statements (2017)
Concrete (2018)
Trust Issues (2020)
Sleep Alone (2021)

References

External links 
 

1992 births
Living people
Musicians from Maribor
21st-century Slovenian women singers
Slovenian pop singers
Eurovision Song Contest entrants of 2011
Eurovision Song Contest entrants for Slovenia
Slovenian expatriates in Sweden